The 2015 Ogun State gubernatorial election occurred on 11 April 2015. Incumbent Governor APC's Ibikunle Amosun won election for a second term, defeating PDP's Adegboyega Isiaka and several minor party candidates. Amosun received 60.38% of the vote.

Ibikunle Amosun emerged unopposed in the APC gubernatorial primary after all the aspirants stepped down. He picked Yetunde Onanuga as his running mate.

Adegboyega Isiaka was the PDP candidate with Bilau Adekunle as his running mate.

Electoral system
The Governor of Ogun State is elected using the plurality voting system.

Primary election

APC primary
The APC primary election was held on --, 2014. The incumbent governor, Sen. Ibikunle Amosun, who was the sole contestant polled 3,554 votes to emerge winner. There were 3, 681 delegates in the exercise, with 16 invalid votes.

Candidates
Party nominee: Ibikunle Amosun.
Running mate: Yetunde Onanuga.

PDP primary
The PDP primary election was held on Monday, December 8, 2014. Even after the National Working Committee (NWC) of the party claimed the election was unauthorized, it was still carried out to produce Adegboyega Isiaka who polled 705 votes as the party's state governorship flag bearer, defeating closest contender, Kayode Amusan, with 150 votes. Omoba Segun Adewale, however, got no vote. There were over 900 delegates from all over the state. Other aspirants for the race include: former Speaker of the House of Representatives, Rt. Hon. Dimeji Bankole; former Minister for Mines and Power, Alh. Sarafadeen Ishola; former chairman Abeokuta South LGA, Prince Yanju Lipede, and others. Nine aggrieved aspirants, including: Asiwaju Tony Ojesina, Prince Yanju Lipede, Dr. Remilekun Bakare, Alh. Sarafa Tunji Ishola, Dr. Yomi Majekodunmi, Prof. David Bamgbose, Isiaq Akinlade, Alh. Rafiu Ogunleye and Hon. Dimeji Bankole, boycotted the election.

Candidates
Party nominee: Adegboyega Isiaka
Running mate: Bilau Adekunle.
 Kayode Amusan
 Omoba Segun Adewale
 Asiwaju Tony Ojesina: Boycotted.
 Remilekun Bakare: Boycotted.
 Yomi Majekodunmi: Boycotted.
 David Bamgbose: Boycotted.
 Isiaq Akinlade: Boycotted.
 Rafiu Ogunleye: Boycotted.
 Dimeji Bankole: Former Speaker, Federal House of Representatives: Boycotted.
 Sarafadeen Tunji Ishola: former chairman Abeokuta South LGA: Boycotted.
 Prince Yanju Lipede: Boycotted.

Results
A total of five candidates registered with the Independent National Electoral Commission to contest in the election. APC Governor Ibikunle Amosun won re-election for a second term, defeating APC's Adegboyega Nasiru Isiaka and other minor party candidates. Amosun received 60.38% of the votes, while Isiaka received 39.62%.

The total number of registered voters in the state was 1,125,657.

By local government area
Here are the results of the election by local government area for the two major parties. Blue represents LGAs won by Amosun. Green represents LGAs won by Isiaka.

References 

Ogun State gubernatorial elections
Gubernatorial election 2020
Ogun State gubernatorial election
2015 Ogun State elections